Milan Sekulić (born 26 January 1995) is a Serbian football midfielder who plays for German club Lüner SV.

References

External links
 
 Milan Sekulić stats at utakmica.rs 
 

1995 births
Living people
Footballers from Belgrade
Association football midfielders
Serbian footballers
OFK Beograd players
OFK Mladenovac players
FK Dinamo Pančevo players
Serbian SuperLiga players